Harold and Friends is a 1988 various artists album credited to Harold G Raffe and Co. It is aimed at teaching young children about their bodies. Artists appearing on the album include Ricky May, Normie Rowe, Doug Ashdown, Maggie McKinney, Karen Johns, Allan Caswell and Cameron Daddo. It was nominated for the ARIA Award for Best Children's Album in 1989.

Harold G Raffe is one of the names given to Healthy Harold, a giraffe mascot for Life Education Australia.

Tracklist
Let's Talk About Life
Harold (We Wanna Be All Like You)
I Can Always Rely On Me
All Your Body Needs
Balanced Diet
Skin
Super Computer
Keep Your Cool
Personality
I'm Your Body

References

1988 albums
Children's music albums